Parliamentary elections were held in Laos on 20 December 1992. They were the first held since the adoption of a permanent constitution a year earlier.

A total of 154 candidates contested the 85 seats, all but four of which were Lao People's Revolutionary Party members. However, all candidates were pre-screened by the LPRP, the dominant force in the Lao Front for National Construction, the only organization allowed to put forward candidates. The LPRP won all 85 seats. Voter turnout was reported to be 99.3%.

Results

References

Laos
Elections in Laos
1992 in Laos
One-party elections
Election and referendum articles with incomplete results